The Department of Information Studies is a department of the UCL Faculty of Arts and Humanities.

The School of Librarianship of the University of London was created in 1919 as a school of University College London. The school was the first school of librarianship that was full-time. The school was shut in 1939 and opened again in 1945. It later changed its name to School of Library, Archive and Information Studies and then to Department of Information Studies. The Department of Information Studies centenary was celebrated in the academic year 2019/2020.

The school formerly awarded a Diploma in Librarianship. From 1970 onwards, this Diploma was known as a Diploma in Library and Information Studies. From 1947, the school also awarded a Diploma in Archive Administration. From 1966, the school also awarded Master of Arts (MA, by examination), Master of Philosophy (MPhil) and Doctor of Philosophy (PhD) degrees in Librarianship or Archives (the MPhil and PhD degrees are awarded for a thesis or dissertation). From 1972, the school also awarded a Master of Science (MSc) degree in information studies. 
The Department currently offers taught postgraduate study in MA Archives and Records Management, MA/MSc Digital Humanities, MSc Information Science, MA Library and Information Studies, MA Publishing, and MRes in Information Studies. The MA Library and Information Studies and the MSc Information Studies programmes are accredited by Chartered Institute of Library and Information Professionals (CILIP), and is in the candidacy stage of accreditation by the American Library Association (ALA) (Accreditation decision in June 2024). Scholarships and bursaries are available such as the scholarship awarded by the Worshipful Company of Stationers and Newspaper Makers.

Reputation and Research 
UCL Department of Information Studies is a centre for research in librarianship, information science, archives and records management, digital humanities and publishing. UCL is currently ranked 10th in the world, and is the UK's largest department of information studies. In September 2017, UCL was ranked fifth in the world for the study of arts and humanities.

The Department currently offers taught postgraduate study in MA Archives and Records Management, MA/MSc Digital Humanities, MSc Information Science, MA Library and Information Studies, Postgraduate Diploma in Library and Information Studies, MA Publishing, and MRes in Information Studies. The PG Dip/MA Library and Information Studies,  and the MSc Information Studies programmes are accredited by Chartered Institute of Library and Information Professionals (CILIP), and the MA LIS is in the candidacy stage of accreditation by the American Library Association (ALA)  (accreditation decision in June 2022). The school is part of the iSchools consortium of information schools.

Facilities 
UCL is one of the main institutions in London's Knowledge Quarter, comprising the area around King's Cross, the Euston Road and Bloomsbury. The Department of Information Studies is located in the heart of UCL's Bloomsbury Campus, in Foster Court.

Libraries 
The UCL library system comprises 17 libraries located across several sites within the main UCL campus and across Bloomsbury, linked together by a central networking catalogue and request system called Explore. The libraries contain a total of over 2 million books.

Main Library 
It is now the largest Library but it origins as the Small Library in the Wilkins Building. It is located on the 1st floor of the Wilkins Building.

History 
It is the earliest library opened in the Wilkins Building just over a year after the first UCL Librarian, Revd Dr Francis Augustus Cox was appointed in 1827. The first UCL Librarian, Revd Dr Francis Augustus Cox, was appointed in 1827.

The first purpose-built General Library opened in 1849 and was later renamed after the Professor of Architecture who designed it, Thomas Leverton Donaldson.

In 1907 the Library expanded to take up the whole length of the first floor of the Wilkins Building and became the Main Library, still very popular with students today and often appearing in films and television programmes.

It contains collections relating to the arts and humanities, economics, history, law and public policy.

Directors 

Each of the following persons was director of the School of Librarianship, the School of Library, Archive and Information Studies, or the Department of Information Studies, during the period specified after their name:
Ernest A. Baker (1919-1934)
John Duncan Cowley (1934-1944) 
Raymond Irwin (1944-1969)
 Prof. Arthur Brown (1969-1973) 
Brian Campbell Vickery (1973-1983)
A.G. Watson (1984- 1990)
Robin C. Alston (1990-1995)
Ia Mcllwaine (1995-2001)
Susan Hockey (2001-2004)
David Nicholas (2004-2011)
Claire Warwick (2011-2013)
Rob Miller (2013-2018)
Elizabeth Shepherd (2018-2023)

Research Centres 
The Department is structured around four research centres, which also engage in interdisciplinary and cross-domain research.
 Centre for Digital Humanities
 ICARUS] (International Centre for Archives and Records Management Research
 Centre for Publishing
Forum on Information Literacy
 KIDS (Knowledge Information and Data Science Group)

UCL Centre for Digital Humanities 
The UCL Centre for Digital Humanities was founded in 2010. It offers research opportunities at postgraduate level, as well as short-courses. Its research its multidisciplinary, covering the intersection of digital technologies with the humanities.

ICARUS 
The International Centre for Archives and Records Management Research was founded in 2005 and defines its research as the following:Developing and contributing to an active, international, inclusive and sustainable network of critical and reflective thinking on archives and records management practice.

Facilitating the ethical and effective utilisation of archives, records, information, heritage and the work of managing them, in support of wider societal goals including social justice, social cohesion and more equitable access to information.

Centre for Publishing 
The Centre for Publishing offers a research-led MA in Publishing as well as the opportunity to engage with nearby publishing organisations in Central London. The Centre also engages in collaborative interdisciplinary research, in areas including information science, digital humanities, and library and archive studies. There is a strong emphasis on the digital aspects of publishing.

Forum on Information Literacy 
Founded at UCL in 2019, the Forum on Information Literacy is a researchers' alliance with an interest in groundbreaking and disruptive research into information literacy in all its forms. It represents a space for academic researchers who are active in the field of information literacy research in the UK, to discuss and challenge ideas, and to engage in critical reflection on theory, practice and praxis oriented research, including the following goals:

 Identify the critical challenges that information literacy addresses and produce research, evidence and ideas that move the IL agenda forward nationally and globally 
 Explore new theoretical and methodological approaches to deepen understanding of IL practice
 Address real world problems, encouraging and extending  collaboration in, & co-production of, IL research via disciplinary, interdisciplinary and practitioner contexts  
 Challenge and interrogate the discourse communities around IL research and contribute to deeper understanding of IL as a social practice.

Knowledge, Information and Data Science (KIDS) Group 
KIDS is an active research group with interests and expertise that span across a number of disciplines including: knowledge representation, reasoning about actions, natural language processing, probabilistic logics, non-monotonic logics, argumentation, Bayesian reasoning, statistical machine learning, data science and crowdsourcing. Their overarching research objective is to develop methodologies, algorithms and paradigms that build bridges between logic-based AI and statistical machine learning approaches, as well as finding practical applications in robust real-world applications. UCL Human Informatics (UCLHI) is an interest group within KIDS that collaborating with UCL Psychology and Brain Science explores multidisciplinary aspects of human activities with information systems.

KIDS facilitates PhD research in topics related to knowledge organisation, knowledge representation or knowledge-based reasoning, as well as interaction with research communities in the wider profession, including the International Society for Knowledge Organisation, the Universal Decimal Classification Consortium, and the Bliss Classification Association.

Notable students and staff
 Library and Information Science
S. R. Ranganathan (b. 1892- d. 1972) - Mathematician and Librarian
Lynne Brindley (b. 1950) - first female Chief Executive of the British Library.
Richard Ovenden (b. 1964) - Bodley's Librarian, Bodleian Library, 2014–present.  
Brian Vickery (b.1918- d.2009) - founder of the Classification Research Group, Director of SLAIS (now DIS) at UCL, 1973–1983.
David McKitterick (b. 1948-) - now Emeritus Honorary Professor of Historical Bibliography at Trinity College, Cambridge.
Andrew Dalby (b.1947)
Stephen Robertson (computer scientist) (b. 1946) - Now retired, Robertson is Professor Emeritus at City University, and a Visiting Professor in the Department of Computer Science at UCL. The Stephen Robertson prize for the best dissertation in the UCL MA/MSc in Digital Humanities is named after him.
Nicholas Belkin - Professor at the School of Communication and Information at Rutgers University
Publishing
Iain Stevenson (d.2017) - Professor Emeritus in Publishing at the UCL Centre for Publishing.

Early history of the Department 
At the time of its opening, the School of Librarianship was advertised as being "organised so as to give a systematic training on a broad basis to Students who are already Librarians or who propose to adopt Librarianship as their profession. It will also be available for others who desire to increase their knowledge in one or other of the branches of its work."

Admission was subject to "such enquiries as [the Provost] may deem necessary in each case, and after receiving reports from the appropriate College officers. The Tutor to Women Students advises the Provost as to the admission of Women Students."

In its first session, 1919–1920, the following programme of study was available to students:

A. General Subjects

(Courses in Latin, English, French, German, other Modern Languages, History, and other Arts and Science subjects.)

B. Day Courses

 Bibliography
 Cataloguing and Indexing
 Classification
 Library Organisation
 Public Library Law
 Library Routine
 Literary History and Book Selection
 Palaeography and Archives
 Demonstrations and Visits

C. Evening Courses

 Cataloguing and Indexing
 Literary History and Book Selection

D. Practical Instruction

E. Public Lectures.

Awards
The UCL Department of Information Studies offers three prizes every year for the Library and Information Studies programme:
Sir John MacAlister Medal founded in 1926 in the memory of Sir John MacAlister, who founded the School of Librarianship. The medal is awarded to the most distinguished candidate in the MA in Library and Information Studies. The medal was awarded to Brooke Cambie in 2022, Grace Troth in 2021, Alex Plane in 2020, Chris Fripp in 2019, Anne Binsfeld in 2018, Eve Burman-Lacey in 2017, Emma Sillett in 2016, Amy McEwan in 2015, Katherine Williams in 2014, Natalie Kent in 2013, Matthew Seddon in 2012, Joanna Maddocks in 2011 and Vanessa Freedman in 2010.
Cowley Prize founded in 1950 in memory of John D. Cowley, the late director of the School of Librarianship, with the royalties received from the publication entitled The Libraries in London, being a course of lectures given at the Easter Vacation Course in Librarianship in 1948; awarded to two distinguished candidates for the MA Degree in Library and Information Studies. The prizes were awarded to Alex Hewitt, Catherine Drewry and Ella Burrows in 2022, Madeleine Ahern and Lauren Ward in 2021, Sally Hamer and Ruth Long in 2020, Simon Cloudesley and Rachael Seculer-Faber in 2019, Catherine Chorley and Lucy Royle in 2018, Lauren Dolman and Hannah Rowe in 2017, Niamh Delaney and Rebecca Scott in 2016, George Bray and Sarah Etheridge in 2015, Sarah Charles and Oliver Henderson Smith in 2014, Alice Dowhyj and Amy Icke in 2013, Erika Delbecque and Victoria Wilson in 2012, Sarah Fletcher and Fiona Godber in 2011, and Paul Stephens and Tabitha Tuckett in 2010.
Mary Piggott Prize in memory of Mary Piggott, who taught Cataloguing and Classification in the school from 1947-1974; awarded to the student on the MA or Postgraduate Diploma in LIS who achieves the highest total mark for Cataloguing and Classification. The prize was awarded to Brooke Cambie and Andrew Frampton in 2022, David Smith in 2021, Jess Miller in 2020, Chris Fripp in 2019, Catherine Chorley, Cathy Goodin and Anna Zajda in 2018, Eve Burman-Lacey in 2017, Lauran Richards in 2016, Emily Delahaye and Elżbieta Szubarczyk in 2015, Dorothy Fouracre and Julija Paskova in 2014, Ed Lacey in 2013, Evelyn Jamieson in 2012, Fiona Godber in 2011, and Lesley Ruthven and Tabitha Tuckett in 2010.

UCL LIS students have also been successful within national awards:

 The CILIP Student Prize was awarded to UCL students, Simon Cloudesley in 2020, Lucy Royle in 2019 and Eve Burman Lacey in 2018. 
The Sherif Student Award was awarded to UCL students Catherine Drewry in 2022, Amelia Brookins in 2021, Abigail Chapman in 2020, Morgan Wilkinson in 2018 and Alex Keane in 2017.
The E.T. Bryant Memorial Prize was awarded to UCL students Amy McMullen in 2018, Julia Paskova in 2014, Amelie Roper in 2005 and Catherine Wilson in 1998. 
The BIALL Student Award was awarded to UCL students Steve Mishkin in 2016 and Chris Cooper in 2009.

The Archives and Records Management programme awards the following two prizes:

 Sir Hilary Jenkinson Prize in memory of Hilary Jenkinson, the archive theorist who influenced the University of London's decision to establish a Diploma in Archive Studies; awarded annually to a student of distinction in the MA in Archives and Records Management. The prize was awarded to Nigel Nugawela in 2018–2019, Camille Johnson in 2016–2017, Jenny Marsden in 2015–2016, Helen Wong in 2014–2015, Katrina Harrington in 2013–2014, Etienne Joseph in 2012–2013, Thomas Barnes in 2011–2012, Carly Donaldson-Randall and Kelda Roe in 2010-2011 and Meirian Jump in 2009–2010. 
 Churchill-Jenkinson Prize awarded to an outstanding student on the Archives and Records Management programme. The prize was awarded to Philip Milnes-Smith in 2017–2018, Sarah Singh in 2016–2017, Katherine Chorley in 2015–2016, Georgina Orgill in 2014–2015, Helen Sumping in 2013–2014, Sean Rippington in 2012–2013, Elizabeth Moody in 2011–2012, Jonathan Cable in 2010-2011 and Elizabeth Morgan in 2009–2010.

References

Departments of University College London
Information science